Clark King (born December 1, 1949) is an American speed skater. He competed in three events at the 1972 Winter Olympics.

References

1949 births
Living people
American male speed skaters
Olympic speed skaters of the United States
Speed skaters at the 1972 Winter Olympics
Sportspeople from Burbank, California